Greenfingers is a 2000 British comedy film directed and written by Joel Hershman. It is loosely based on the true story about the award-winning prisoners of HMP Leyhill, a minimum-security prison in the Cotswolds, England, a story published in The New York Times in 1998.

Plot
When Colin Briggs, a convicted murderer, is placed in an experimental programme to finish off his prison sentence, all he wants is peace and quiet. After his wise, elderly roommate Fergus, imprisoned for killing three wives, introduces him to gardening, Colin uncovers a talent and passion for plants. When he accidentally raises a patch of double-violets, the warden assigns him to cultivate a garden, with other prisoners as his assistants.

Teaming up with his fellow inmates, Colin gets the attention of celebrated gardener Georgina Woodhouse. Soon, the unexpected gardeners are preparing to compete for the Hampton Court Flower Show. When Colin meets Georgina's beautiful daughter Primrose, he discovers another reason to fight for his freedom: true love.

Cast
 Clive Owen – Colin Briggs
 Helen Mirren – Georgina Woodhouse
 Natasha Little – Primrose Woodhouse
 David Kelly – Fergus Wilks
 Warren Clarke – Gov. Hodge
 Danny Dyer – Tony
 Adam Fogerty – Raw
 Paterson Joseph – Jimmy
 Lucy Punch – Holly

Production 
The film was shot in Britain in five weeks on a budget of £2 million, with the help of the Royal Horticultural Society and English garden designer Rosemary Verey.

References

External links
 
 
 
 Guys, How Does Your Garden Grow? The New York Times, 27 July 2001.

2000 films
2000 comedy films
British comedy films
British prison films
Environmental films
Fireworks Entertainment films
Films produced by Trudie Styler
2000s English-language films
2000s British films